Łódki  is a village in the administrative district of Gmina Smołdzino, within Słupsk County, Pomeranian Voivodeship, in northern Poland.

References

Villages in Słupsk County